A Hillbilly Tribute to Mountain Love is the second album by American band Hayseed Dixie, released in 2002 (see 2002 in music).

Track listing
"My Best Friend's Girl" (Ric Ocasek) (The Cars cover) – 2:54
"Centerfold" (Seth Justman) (The J. Geils Band cover) – 2:57
"Walk This Way" (Joe Perry, Steven Tyler) (Aerosmith cover) – 4:16
"Feel Like Making Love" (Mick Ralphs, Paul Rodgers) (Bad Company cover) – 3:45
"The Perfect Woman" (Jetton, Wheeler) – 2:53
"I Love Rock & Roll" (Jerry Mamberg, Alan Sachs) (Arrows cover) – 2:09
"Fat Bottomed Girls" (Brian May) (Queen cover) – 3:07
"Big Bottom" (Christopher Guest, Michael McKean, Rob Reiner, Harry Shearer) (Spinal Tap cover) – 3:21
"Cat Scratch Fever" (Ted Nugent) (Ted Nugent cover) – 2:43
"I'm Keeping Your Poop" (Wheeler) – 2:21

Personnel
Dale Reno – mandolin
Don Wayne Reno – banjo
John Wheeler – bass, violin, acoustic guitar, vocals

Production
Producer: John Wheeler
Engineer: John Wheeler
Design: John Wheeler
Photography: John Wheeler
Promoter: Alan Rommelfanger

Chart performance

Hayseed Dixie albums
2002 albums
Dualtone Records albums